Alfred Fedetsky (1857, Zhytomyr, Russian Empire, now Ukraine, — 21 July 1902, Minsk, Russian Empire, now Belarus) was a prominent Ukrainian photographer and filmmaker of Polish descent, who authored numerous portraits of notable Russian people (Aivazovsky, Tchaikovsky, John of Kronstadt, among many others) as well as members of the Imperial family. He was the personal photographer of Duchess Alexandra Petrovna of Oldenburg.

Alfred Fedetsky was born in 1857 in Zhytomyr, Volhynian Governorate (now Ukraine). He finished Imperial Photographic Institute at the Academy of Fine Arts Vienna. Afterwards Alfred Fedetsky moved to Kyiv Governorate in 1880. Six years later he moved to Kharkiv. His teacher as well as his spiritual mentor was the photographer Wlodzimierz Vysotsky, who had the title of photographer of the Court of Her Imperial Highness Grand Duchess Alexandra Petrovna.

Working mostly in Kharkiv, Fedetsky was also a pioneering cinematographer. His is credited with being the first Russian to shoot the first ever Russian film (the Frenchman Camille Cerf preceded him by four months, with the film of the coronation of Czar Nicholas II at the Kremlin in May 1896) called "The Grand Transfer of the Ozeryanskaya Icon from the Kuryazh Monastery to Kharkiv, on 20 September 1896".

In July 1902 Alfred Fedetsky died in Minsk. On the 26th of July, Fedetsky was buried in the Cemetery of the Beheading of St. John the Baptist, in a family crypt next to his wife.

References 

Russian photographers
Ukrainian photographers
Film directors from the Russian Empire
1857 births
1902 deaths
Artists from Zhytomyr
Ukrainian people of Polish descent